Ligny-en-Weppes is a former commune in the Nord department in northern France.  In 1927 it merged with Beaucamps to form Beaucamps-Ligny.

Heraldry

See also
Communes of the Nord department

Former communes of Nord (French department)